Hezekiah Hamilton Hunter (1837 – 1894) was an American teacher, minister and politician. He was an African-American politician during the Reconstruction Era and served in the South Carolina House of Representatives from 1870 to 1872.

Biography 
Hunter was born in 1837 in Brooklyn, New York; he was of mixed African and European ancestry and was born free. He was sent to the southern United States as a Presbyterian minister in 1865 by the American Missionary Association to teach and minister. Hunter represented Charleston County, South Carolina, in the South Carolina House of Representatives from 1870 to 1872.

He wrote to United States president Ulysses S. Grant in support of a proclamation of martial law in South Carolina counties with Ku Klux Klan activity. He compared murdered president Abraham Lincoln to Moses and Grant to Joshua, calling on him in the future as in the past to protect "all wherever the Starry Banner Floats" and to stop the Klan from making the "night hideous with the cries of poor women and children" pleading for their own lives and those of their natural protectors; — their fathers sons and husbands." Hunter protested the Enterprise Railroad over concerns on its impact on the employment prospects of draymen.

The 1870 census recorded him owning $3,650 in real estate and $230 in personal property.

See also
 African-American officeholders during and following the Reconstruction era

References

1837 births
1894 deaths
Politicians from Brooklyn
African-American politicians during the Reconstruction Era
Members of the South Carolina House of Representatives
American Presbyterian ministers
Politicians from Charleston, South Carolina